Lugazi is a town in the Buikwe District of the Central Region of Uganda. The town is also called "Kawolo", and the two names are interchangeably used by the local inhabitants.

Location
The coordinates of Lugazi are 0°22'08.0"N, 32°56'25.0"E (Latitude:0.368889; Longitude:32.940278).

Points of interest
The following points of interest lie within the town or close to its boundaries:

 offices of Lugazi Town Council
 headquarters of the Roman Catholic Diocese of Lugazi
 Lugazi central market
 headquarters of the Mehta Group in Uganda
 University of Military Science and Technology, which is owned and administered by the Uganda People's Defence Force
 Kawolo Hospital, a 200-bed public hospital administered by the Uganda Ministry of Health
 Lugazi Golf Course, which is located on the grounds of SCUL
 branch of the National Social Security Fund (Uganda)
 Kampala-Jinja Highway, passing through the center of town in an east/west configuration

Population
The 2002 national census estimated the population of Lugazi at 27,979. In 2010, the Uganda Bureau of Statistics (UBOS) estimated the population at 34,500. In 2011, UBOS estimated the population at 35,500. In 2014, the national census put the population at 114,163.

Sports
In 2012, a Little League baseball team from Lugazi qualified for the 2012 Little League World Series in Williamsport, Pennsylvania. This was the second ever team from Uganda to qualify and the first to make the trip to the USA. The team that qualified in 2011 were denied visas by the State Department, therefore having to concede the MEA region title to Dhahran, Saudi Arabia.

Lugazi is also the home of the Uganda Revenue Authority SC, a member of the Uganda Premier Soccer League.

See also

Roman Catholic Diocese of Lugazi
List of cities and towns in Uganda

References

Populated places in Central Region, Uganda
Cities in the Great Rift Valley
Buikwe District